John Perry (13 July 1845 – 10 May 1922) was an Australian politician.

He was born in Sydney; his father, Julius Perry, was a bank clerk. He attended public schools at Surry Hills and Fort Street, and in 1861 began working for Watkins and Leigh, an importing firm. By the 1870s he was a sugar cane grower, also running a store at Alstonville. On 13 November 1870 he married Susan McAuslan Alston, with whom he had a son.

In 1889 he was elected to the New South Wales Legislative Assembly for Richmond, belonging to the Protectionist Party. He transferred to Ballina in 1894, back to Richmond in 1904, and to Byron in 1913. After the collapse of the Protectionists' successor, the Progressive Party, in 1904, he joined the Liberal Party, along with most of his remaining party colleagues. Perry retired in 1920 and died at Pittwater two years later, aged .

References

 

1845 births
1922 deaths
Protectionist Party politicians
Nationalist Party of Australia members of the Parliament of New South Wales
Members of the New South Wales Legislative Assembly